"Hold Me, Thrill Me, Kiss Me, Kill Me" is a song by Irish rock band U2. It was released as a single from the Batman Forever soundtrack album on 5 June 1995. A number-one single in their home country of Ireland, as well as in seven other countries, it reached number two on the UK Singles Chart, number sixteen on the US Billboard Hot 100, and number one on the Billboard Album Rock Tracks and Modern Rock Tracks charts. The song received Grammy Award nominations for Best Rock Performance by a Duo or Group with Vocal and Best Rock Song. The song is included on the compilation album The Best of 1990–2000 and the live album From the Ground Up: Edge's Picks from U2360°.

History
"Hold Me, Thrill Me, Kiss Me, Kill Me" has its origins in the sessions for the band's 1993 album, Zooropa.  Bono described it as being about "being in a rock band" and "being a star". The song's title comes from a play on the classic song "Hold Me, Thrill Me, Kiss Me" and it is actually visible (along with the titles of other unfinished tracks) on the album cover of Zooropa, written in purple text.

U2's involvement with the soundtrack began when director Joel Schumacher attempted to create a cameo role for Bono as MacPhisto in Batman Forever, in which the character was intended to appear at a party scene. Although both tried to make the scene happen, they came to agree it was not suitable for the film. Instead, the band offered "Hold Me, Thrill Me, Kiss Me, Kill Me" as a contribution to the soundtrack.

The song was played live on every show of the PopMart Tour as part of the encore and appeared at all 93 of the tour's concerts. It was not played again until the 2010 leg of the U2 360° Tour, opening the second encore. From there, it remained a permanent part of the encore until the end of the tour in 2011. Weird Al recorded a parody for his album Bad Hair Day titled "Cavity Search".

During U2's 2018 Experience + Innocence Tour, a new "Gotham Experience Remix" of the song was played during a brief intermission in the concerts. Remixed by St Francis Hotel, the track contains vocals by Gavin Friday and Arcade Fire's Régine Chassagne. In November 2018, the remix was released on a limited edition 12-inch vinyl single for Black Friday Record Store Day, with a remaster of the original song on the reverse side.

Critical reception
Steve Baltin from Cash Box picked "Hold Me, Thrill Me, Kiss Me, Kill Me" as Pick of the Week, adding, "As a song, it s more electronical than anything they’ve done previously, but if one looks closely enough at their recent efforts, namely Zooropa, the transition follows a smooth path." Pan-European magazine Music & Media wrote, "In the week Superman suffered dearly from his broken wings, his rival Batman enjoys his best tribute since Prince's attempt. Atypical U2 with strings and handclaps, The The and T-Rex blend." British magazine Music Week gave it a 4/5 score in their review, adding, "U2 fans are in for a treat with the first release from the Batman Forever soundtrack, a swirling rock affair with orchestral overtones." David Sinclair from The Times described the song as "a suitably gothic production." He explained, "Introduced by a deceptively languid riff, Bono's vocal slithers out of the speakers swathed in that sinister phrasing effect which he first deployed on Zoo Station. You don't know what you're doing, babe it must be art, he sneers while synthesizers, an orchestra and a big buzzy guitar sound create a dark, restless backdrop hovering somewhere between I am the Walrus and Children of the Revolution."

Accolades
It was nominated for a Golden Globe Award for Best Original Song, losing to "Colors of the Wind" for Pocahontas. It also received Grammy Award nominations for Best Rock Performance by a Duo or Group with Vocal and Best Rock Song. It also received a Golden Raspberry Award nomination for Worst Original Song, where it lost to "Walk Into the Wind" from Showgirls.

Music video
The animated music video to the song (interspersed with clips from the film) was directed by Kevin Godley and Maurice Linnane.
It features the band performing in Gotham City, with Bono battling between two of his alter-egos from the Zoo TV Tour: "The Fly" and "MacPhisto." The band also chases the Batwing, using a yellow supercar and their guitars as flamethrowers. The animated sequence also features characters dressed as The Riddler, Dr. Chase Meridian, and Dick Grayson, in scenes similar to those in the movie.

At one brief point of the video, a neon sign can be seen that reads "Mister Pussey's". In another scene, U2 are seen walking down the street when Bono is run over by a car (driven by Elvis) while reading a copy of C.S. Lewis' The Screwtape Letters. The next scene shows Bono in the hospital flatlining and about to die, when a bolt of red lightning strikes his heart monitor turning his skin white, his shirt red, and causing his fingernails to grow, thus transforming him into MacPhisto. He makes his appearance, terrifying the doctors and the other band members. The video ends with an orchestra of Batmen playing the outro on strings, then a shot from above of MacPhisto repeatedly transforming into Batman and MacPhisto alternately.

Author Višnja Cogan said the video "crystallises and concludes the Zoo TV period and the changes that occurred" for the band during that time.

Formats and track listings
The song featured singles with three different track listings. Note that the B-sides on the first two singles are non-U2 songs.

There was also a single-track CD distributed in the U.S as part of a Batman Forever gift bag, along with a collectible comic book, trading card, and pogs.

Personnel
Bono – vocals
The Edge – guitar, string arrangement
Adam Clayton – bass guitar
Larry Mullen Jr. – drums
Marius de Vries – keyboards, programming
Craig Armstrong – string arrangement

Charts and certifications

Weekly charts

Year-end charts

Certifications

See also
 List of cover versions of U2 songs – Hold Me, Thrill Me, Kiss Me, Kill Me
 List of number-one singles in Australia during the 1990s
 List of RPM number-one alternative rock singles of 1995
 List of number-one singles of 1995 (Ireland)
 List of number-one singles in 1995 (New Zealand)
 List of number-one hits in Norway
 List of number-one mainstream rock hits (United States)
 Number one modern rock hits of 1995

References

Songs about kissing
1995 singles
U2 songs
Batman music
Glam rock songs
Music videos directed by Kevin Godley
Number-one singles in Australia
Number-one singles in Finland
Number-one singles in Hungary
Number-one singles in Iceland
Irish Singles Chart number-one singles
Number-one singles in New Zealand
Number-one singles in Norway
Number-one singles in Scotland
Island Records singles
Atlantic Records singles
Songs written by Bono
Songs written by the Edge
Songs written by Adam Clayton
Songs written by Larry Mullen Jr.
1995 songs
Songs written for films
Song recordings produced by Nellee Hooper
Animated music videos
Batman (1989 film series)